"Blame It on Texas" is a song written by Ronnie Rogers and Mark Wright, and recorded by American country music singer Mark Chesnutt.  It was released in March 1991 as the third single from his debut album Too Cold at Home.  It peaked at #5 in the United States, and #4 in Canada.

Content
The narrator tells that from his humble beginnings in Beaumont, Texas (Chesnutt's birthplace) he has traveled all around the country. He says it's great and all but he still prefers Texas. In the second verse, he describes hooking up with an Oklahoma oil heiress, then leaving her in the middle of the night because he missed home. In each chorus he tells the audience to blame his insanity on Texas, not him.

Critical reception
An uncredited review in Cashbox described the song as "destined to create a little toe-tappin' and finger-snappin' action" with "pure country vocals".

Chart performance

Year-end charts

References

[  Allmusic]

1990 songs
1991 singles
Mark Chesnutt songs
Songs written by Ronnie Rogers
Songs written by Mark Wright (record producer)
Song recordings produced by Mark Wright (record producer)
Songs about Texas
MCA Records singles